Subaru (written  in kanji,  in hiragana, or  in katakana) is the Japanese name for the Pleiades star cluster.  It is primarily a masculine given name in Japanese. Notable people with the name include:

, Japanese voice actor and singer
, Japanese footballer
Subaru Oozora, Hololive member
, the former member of Kanjani∞
, Japanese cross-country skier

Fictional characters 
 Ryoko Subaru, a character in Martian Successor Nadesico
 Subaru, a character in Maid-sama!
 Subaru, a character in .hack//SIGN
 Subaru, a Byakko celestial warrior in Fushigi Yūgi
 Subaru Hasegawa - main character in the light novel and anime series Ro-Kyu-Bu!
 Subaru Hoshikawa (Geo Stelar in the English translation), a character in Mega Man Star Force
 Subaru Konoe, the lead character and female protagonist in Mayo Chiki
 Subaru Mikage, a character in Comic Party
 Subaru Mikazuki, the lead character in My Roommate is a Cat
 Subaru Miyamoto, a character in the manga Subaru
 Subaru Nagayoshi, a character in The Idolmaster Million Live!
 Subaru Nakajima, a character in Magical Girl Lyrical Nanoha Strikers
Subaru Natsuki, protagonist of the light novel series Re:Zero − Starting Life in Another World
 Subaru Sakamaki, a character in Diabolik Lovers
 Subaru Shinjo, a character in the Battle Arena Toshinden fighting game series
 Subaru Sumeragi, a character in Tokyo Babylon, X/1999 and Tsubasa: Reservoir Chronicle
 Subaru Tachibana, a main character in the manga series Stray Human
 Subaru Yagi, a character in the manga series Hot Gimmick
 Subaru Mitejima, a character in the manga series Twin Star Exorcists
 Subaru Oozora, Hololive member
 Subaru Akehoshi, a character in the game franchise Ensemble Stars!

Japanese masculine given names